Pauline Margaret Griffin (July 5, 1947 – August 11, 2020), who wrote as P. M. Griffin, was an American author of speculative fiction. She was predominately known for her  Star Commandos military science fiction series (1986–2004), described as "untaxing" in her Encyclopedia of Science Fiction entry, as well as her contributions to various Andre Norton series, such as Time Traders, Solar Queen, and Witch World.

Select bibliography

Star Commandos
 Star Commandos (1986)
 Colony in Peril (1987)
 Mission Underground (1988)
 Death Planet (1989)
 Mind Slayer (1990)
 Return to War (1990)
 Fire Planet (1990)
 Call to Arms (1991)
 Jungle Assault (1991)
 Watchdogs of Space (2003)
 Pariah (2003)
 War Prince (2004)

Time Traders
 Firehand (1994) with Andre Norton

Solar Queen
 Redline the Stars (1993) with Andre Norton

Witch World universe
 Witch World: The Turning: Storms of Victory (1991) with Andre Norton
 Seakeep (1991)
 Flight of Vengeance (1992) with Andre Norton and Mary H. Schaub
 Falcon Hope (1992)

Standalone novels
 Stand at Cornith (2014)
 Survivor (2014)
 Fell Conquest (2015)
 The Purgatorio Virus (2015)
 Haunted World (2016)
 Bad Neighbors (2016)
 The Elven King (2017)
 Rebels' World (2017)

References

External links

1947 births
2020 deaths
American science fiction writers
Women science fiction and fantasy writers